Brescia–Cremona railway is a railway line in Lombardy, Italy.

History 
The line was opened on 15 December 1866.

In 1984 it was electrified with a 3 kV DC overhead line.

See also 
 List of railway lines in Italy

References

Footnotes

Sources

External links 

Railway lines in Lombardy
Railway lines opened in 1866
1866 establishments in Italy
Cremona